Eduardo Liendo Zurita (Caracas, 12 January 1941) is a Venezuelan writer and scholar.  His novella Mascarada won Honorable Mention in the "Fiction City Award" (Caracas, 1978) and the Pedro León Zapata humor prize in 1981. In 1985, he received the Municipal Prize for Literature. and in 1990, the CONAC book award (From the former national council of culture of Venezuela).

Bibliography
 El mago de la cara de vidrio (1973)
 Los Topos (1975)
 Mascarada (1978)
 Los platos del diablo (1985)
 El cocodrilo rojo (1987)
 Si yo fuera Pedro Infante (1989)
 Diario del enano (1995)
 El round del olvido (2002)
 Las kuitas del hombre mosca (2005)
 Contraespejismo (2008)
 El último fantasma (2009)
 En torno al oficio de escritor (2014)
 Contigo en la distancia (2014)

See also 
Venezuela
List of Venezuelan writers

References 
 Eduardo Liendo - R.E. Lectura
 Eduardo Liendo: "Yo soy deudor de mi Caracas" - Estampas magazine
 Eduardo Liendo Zurita - Lecturalia

1941 births
Living people

Venezuelan novelists
Venezuelan male writers
Male novelists
People from Caracas